Pinezići is a village on the island of Krk, Croatia. It is situated in the western part of the island, 9km from the city of Krk.

Population 

According to the last census of 2011, there were 196 inhabitants in Pinezići. This is an increase from 134 inhabitants from the 2001 census.

Economy 

Residents of Pinezići are mainly engaged in farming, fishing, and more recently tourism. The main beach is situated in the bay "Jert".

References 

Krk
Populated places in Primorje-Gorski Kotar County